Audi is a German automotive manufacturer.

Audi may also refer to:

List of Audi vehicles, models referred to as Audi
Bank Audi, a Lebanese bank
Audi (song), a 2017 song by Smokepurpp